Sitdjehuti (d. 1550/1500 BC, also Satdjehuti; “Daughter of Thoth”) was a princess and queen of the late Seventeenth Dynasty of Egypt. She was a daughter of Pharaoh Senakhtenre Ahmose and Queen Tetisheri. She was the wife of her brother Seqenenre Tao and was the mother of Princess Ahmose.

Life
Sitdjehuti was a daughter of Pharaoh Senakhtenre Ahmose and a sister to Pharaoh Seqenenre Tao and the queens Ahhotep and Ahmose Inhapy. She was married to her (half-)brother Seqenenre-Tao and bore him a daughter, Ahmose. On her sarcophagus, she is stated to be the daughter of Tetisheri. Her other name is given as Satibu.

Titles 
Sitdjehuti's titles include King's Wife, King's Sister, and King's Daughter. 

King's Wife. She is mentioned on the mummy shroud of her daughter Ahmose, which was found in the Valley of the Queens (QV47). Ahmose is called the King's Daughter and Queen's Sister. This states that Ahmose was the daughter of King Seqenenre Tao and Sitdjehuti.

King's Daughter. Her mother appear on her coffin as Tetisheri, indicating that her father may have been Senakhtenre Ahmose. If so, she named her daughter after her father, princess Ahmose. It would also make her the sister of Ahhotep.

King's Sister. It is not confirmed who her king-brother was. Presumably it was her husband Seqenenre.

Death
She died between c. 1545-1513 BC. As indicated by her linen, Ahmose-Nefertari donated the cloth for her burial. At that time Ahmose-Nefertari held the title King's Mother, referring to Amenhotep I (c. 1545-1526 BC, high chronology). The style of her burial is early D18, and some features became common with Thutmose I onwards. She most likely died during the reign of Amenhotep I.

She must have been a woman of relatively old age, having outlived Ahmose I and Amenhotep I.

Burial
Sitdjehuti's mummy was discovered around 1820, along with its coffin, golden mask, a heart scarab, and linens donated by her niece Queen Ahmose-Nefertari.

The linen is inscribed with the text:
Given in the favour of the god's wife, king's wife and king's mother Ahmose Nefertari may she live, so Satdjehuty.
 
The Coffin Lid is now held at Munich 

The Mymmy Mask is located in the British Museum (EA 29770).

References

External links

 Mummy Mask of Satdjehuty from the British Museum.

16th-century BC women
Queens consort of the Seventeenth Dynasty of Egypt
Ancient Egyptian mummies
Princesses of the Seventeenth Dynasty of Egypt